Hans Olof Ragnemalm (30 March 1940 – 7 August 2016) was a Swedish lawyer, judge, and professor emeritus of public law.

Ragnemalm became Professor of Public Law at Lund University, and later Professor of Public Law and Dean of the Law Faculty at the University of Stockholm. He served as Parliamentary Ombudsman between 1987 and 1992, and from 1992 to 1995 as judge at the Supreme Administrative Court of Sweden. 

In 1995 Ragnemalm became Sweden's first judge at the European Court of Justice in Luxembourg. In 2000 he returned to Sweden to serve as President of the Supreme Administrative Court of Sweden until his retirement in 2005.

See also
List of members of the European Court of Justice

References 

1940 births
2016 deaths
Justices of the Supreme Administrative Court of Sweden
European Court of Justice judges
Academic staff of Lund University
Academic staff of Stockholm University
20th-century Swedish judges
Swedish judges of international courts and tribunals
People from Laholm Municipality